Rostock Seawolves is a professional basketball club based in Rostock, Germany. The club currently competes in the Basketball Bundesliga.

The Seawolves play their home games in the Rostocker Stadthalle.

In May 2018, the Seawolves signed Milan Škobalj as their new head coach, who later left the team. In 2020, Dirk Bauermann became head coach.

Players

Current roster

Notable players

Season by season

References

External links
German League Profile
Presentation at Eurobasket.com

Sport in Rostock
Basketball teams in Germany
Basketball teams established in 1994
1994 establishments in Germany